Gnathabelodon is an extinct genus of gomphothere (a sister group to modern elephants) endemic to North America that includes species that lived during the Middle to Late Miocene. 

"Gnathabelodon" buckneri Sellards, 1940 has been renamed Blancotherium.

Description
It has been called the "spoon-billed mastodon" since its lower jaw was elongated and shaped like a shoe-horn or spoon. The flaring of the tip of the lower jaw was similar to that of the "shovel-tuskers" (Platybelodon and Amebelodon); however, Gnathabelodon species are distinct in having no lower tusks whilst the "shovel tuskers" have broad, flattened lower tusks. The upper tusks are large and curve outwards and upwards. With respect to dentition and overall body form, it was similar to species of Gomphotherium, but Mothe et al. (2016) recover Gnathabelodon as closer to brevirostrine gomphotheriids than to Gomphotherium.

References

Sources
 A Pictorial Guide to Fossils by Gerard Ramon Case  
 Classification of Mammals by Malcolm C. McKenna and Susan K. Bell

Miocene proboscideans
Gomphotheres
Miocene mammals of North America
Prehistoric mammals of North America
Prehistoric placental genera